The Intended is 2002 English-language period drama film directed by Kristian Levring and starring Janet McTeer (who also co-wrote the screenplay), JJ Feild, Olympia Dukakis, Tony Maudsley and Brenda Fricker. It centres on a surveyor and his fiancée who arrive in a remote Malaysian trading post and encounter a close-fisted ivory trader and her ill-meaning family.

Cast

Janet McTeer as Sarah Morris
JJ Feild as Hamish Winslow
Olympia Dukakis as Erina
Brenda Fricker as Mrs. Jones
Tony Maudsley as William Jones
David Bradley as The Priest
Philip Jackson as Norton
John Matthew Lau as Judas
Robert Pugh as Le Blanc

Reception
The Intended currently holds a 33% rating on the Rotten Tomatoes website.

References

External links
http://www.imdb.com/title/tt0331525/

2002 films
British drama films
2002 drama films
2000s British films